"Breath of Life" is a 1992 song by English synth-pop duo Erasure, released as the fourth and final single from their fifth studio album, Chorus (1991). It was written by Erasure members Vince Clarke and Andy Bell with additional input from Pat O'Brien. An uptempo synthpop song, its dance music elements were strongly accentuated for the club remixes. For the single release, it was remixed slightly, including a shortened intro. In the United States, it was the third single released from the album.

Critical reception
Ned Raggett from AllMusic said the song is a "polite declaration of love and passion over a gently soaring dance arrangement -- not as full out as other Erasure highlights, but pleasant enough." Larry Flick from Billboard described it as a "pulsating techno/NRG workout", and complimented Bell's voice for being "on target, giving depth to the song's clever wordplay." The Daily Vault's Michael R. Smith noted that "Breath Of Life" "has some great percolating synth work by Vince, but is typical Erasure fare and nothing really much to write home about." Chris Gerard from Metro Weekly wrote, "Driven by dueling keyboard riffs and a sparse, heavy beat", the song is "exciting electronic pop with brilliant melody and vocal by Andy Bell. The vocal arrangement (especially during the 2nd verse) is chilling."

Chart performance
The track became Erasure's eleventh top-10 hit on the UK Singles Chart, peaking at number eight. Their string of top-40 singles in Germany was broken with this release when it peaked at number 44. "Breath of Life" was also a top-10 hit in Finland and Ireland, peaking at number nine and eight. It did not enter the US Billboard Hot 100 but did reach number 29 on the Hot Dance Music/Maxi-Singles Sales chart. Unlike all of Erasure's prior single releases in the UK, all formats of "Breath of Life" contained only remixes and no new compositions as B-side tracks.

Track listings

 7-inch: Mute / MUTE142 (UK)
 "Breath of Life" (Single Mix)
 "Breath of Life" (Swiss Mix)
 "Breath of Life" (Accapella Dub Mix)

 12-inch: Mute / 12 MUTE142 (UK)
 "Breath of Life" (Divine Inspiration Mix)
 "Breath of Life" (Umbilical Mix)
 "Breath of Life" (Swiss Mix)
 "Breath of Life" (Elixir Mix)
 "Breath of Life" (Stripped Mix)

 CD: Mute / CDMUTE142 (UK)
 "Breath of Life" (7" Mix)
 "Breath of Life" (Divine Inspiration Mix)
 "Breath of Life" (Stripped Mix)
 "Breath of Life" (Swiss Mix) [labelled simply 'Breath of Life']
 "Breath of Life" (Accapella Dub Mix)

 CD: Sire / 40344-2 (US)
 "Breath of Life" (Single Remix)
 "Breath of Life" (Divine Inspiration Mix)
 "Breath of Life" (Swiss Mix)
 "Waiting For Sex" (Full Version)
 "Breath of Life" (Umbilical Mix)
 "Breath of Life" (Elixir Mix)
 "Breath of Life" (Stripped Mix)
 "Carry On Clangers"

Charts

References

1991 songs
1992 singles
Erasure songs
Mute Records singles
Sire Records singles
Songs written by Andy Bell (singer)
Songs written by Vince Clarke